The Valley Fire may refer to:

 Valley Fire (2018), a wildfire that burned in San Bernardino National Forest, California, in 2018
 Valley Fire (2020), a wildfire that burned in San Diego County, California in 2020